A mural crown is a crown or headpiece representing city walls, towers, or fortresses. In classical antiquity, it was an emblem of tutelary deities who watched over a city, and among the Romans a military decoration. Later the mural crown developed into a symbol of European heraldry, mostly for cities and towns, and in the 19th and 20th centuries was used in some republican heraldry.

Usage in ancient times 
In Hellenistic culture, a mural crown identified tutelary deities such as the goddess Tyche (the embodiment of the fortunes of a city, familiar to Romans as Fortuna), and Hestia (the embodiment of the protection of a city, familiar to Romans as Vesta). The high cylindrical polos of Rhea/Cybele too could be rendered as a mural crown in Hellenistic times, specifically designating the mother goddess as patron of a city.

The mural crown became an ancient Roman military decoration. The  corona muralis (Latin for "walled crown") was a golden crown, or a circle of gold intended to resemble a battlement, bestowed upon the soldier who first climbed the wall of a besieged city or fortress to successfully place the standard (flag) of the attacking army upon it. The Roman mural crown was made of gold, and decorated with turrets, as is the heraldic version.  As it was among the highest order of military decorations, it was not awarded to a claimant until after a strict investigation. The rostrata mural crown, composed of the rostra indicative of captured ships, was assigned as naval prize to the first in a boarding party, similar to the naval crown.

The Graeco-Roman goddess Roma's attributes on Greek coinage usually include her mural crown, signifying Rome's status as a loyal protector of Hellenic city-states.

Heraldic use 

The Roman military decoration was subsequently employed in European heraldry, where the term denoted a crown modeled after the walls of a castle, which may be tinctured or (gold), argent (silver), gules (red), or proper (i.e. stone-coloured).

In recent times, mural crowns were used, rather than royal crowns, for medieval and modern Italian . A mural-crowned lady, Italia Turrita, personifies Italy. In Italy,  and some provinces and military corps have mural crowns on their coats of arms: gold with five towers for cities, and silver with nine-towered for others. The coat of arms of the Second Spanish Republic had a mural crown.

In the early 20th century Portugal established strict rules for its municipal heraldry, in which each coat of arms contains a mural crown, with three silver towers signifying a village or an urban parish, four silver towers representing a town, five silver towers standing for a city and five gold towers for a capital city. The Portuguese rules are also applied to most municipal coats of arms of Brazil and some other members of the Community of Portuguese Language Countries.

Romanian municipal coats of arms contain a mural crown, with one or three towers for villages and communes, five and seven towers for towns and municipalities.

The eagle on the coat of arms of Austria wears a mural crown to signify its status as a republic. This is in contrast to the royal crowns that adorned the double-headed eagle (and the imperial crown positioned above it) in the coat of arms of Austria-Hungary until their defeat in World War I. The mural-crowned eagle was abandoned under the clerico-fascist Federal State of Austria from 1934, but was reinstated in Allied-occupied Austria following World War II and remains in place to this day.

Examples from heraldry

See also

References

External links 

 

Crowns in heraldry
Crowns (headgear)
Military awards and decorations of ancient Rome
Municipal coats of arms
National symbols of Italy
Iconography
Visual motifs